Coffee production in Sri Lanka peaked in 1870, with over  being cultivated. The Dutch had experimented with coffee cultivation in the 18th century, but it was not successful until the British began large scale commercial production following the Colebrooke–Cameron Commission reforms of 1833. By 1860, the country was amongst the major coffee-producing nations in the world. Although coffee production remains a source of revenue, it is no longer a main economic sector. In 2014, the country ranked 43rd of largest coffee producers in the world.

History
The first arabica coffee plants introduced to Ceylon may have arrived from Yemen via India, by Muslim pilgrims in the early 17th century. However, the Sinhalese were unaware of the use of berries in preparing a beverage. They only used the young leaves for curries and the flowers as offerings at their temples.

The first attempt at systematic cultivation of coffee was undertaken by the Dutch in 1740.  It was initiated by Governor Baron van Imhoff and his successors; van Gollenesse and Loten. However, it was confined to the low-country and was relatively unsuccessful with low levels of production. Production was also restricted by the Dutch East India Company as they did not want competition against coffee produced on their plantations in Java. By 1762, annual coffee production was only 100,000 pounds.

The British, who first arrived on the island in 1796 and took control in 1815, continued experiments with coffee production. These early ventures, mainly in the coastal areas around Galle, failed due to the unsuitability of the area for coffee cultivation. The first to successfully grow coffee on a commercial scale was George Bird, who established a coffee plantation in Singhapitiya. Edward Barnes, who became Governor of Ceylon in 1824, established another plantation in Gannoruwa in 1825 (now a part of the Royal Botanical Gardens, Peradeniya). These were followed by a number of other government officials establishing plantations in the region. The only native to grow coffee on a commercial scale was Jeronis de Soysa and about a quarter of the total production was from the smallholdings of native farmers. Most of these early ventures were economically unsuccessful, due to a number of factors including unsuitability of the lowland areas, competition from the West Indies, lack of cultivation skills and poor infrastructure. The first plantation in the mountainous Kandyan area, was established in 1827 which, a few years later, spread to many other areas in the country, becoming profitable.

At the initiative of the British colonial administration, Sri Lanka experimented with coffee as a plantation crop in the 1830s. Sri Lankan coffee cultivation and export prospered when the West Indies ended slavery, which affected its extensive coffee production. Further expansion occurred when the British government in Sri Lanka sold government lands they had obtained from the kings of Kandyan. Tamil labour from South India was recruited by the 1830s. During the period 1830–1850, coffee production assisted in the country's development and a capitalist society emerged. The Bank of Ceylon supported the proliferation of coffee estates, which resulted in infrastructure development within the Kandyan region. During the period of worldwide economic depression in 1846, production declined, conflicts arose, and taxes were levied to compensate the losses to the economy, due to the falling price of coffee. Labour conscription was introduced in 1848, causing a rebellion, which was later quelled. However, the plantation era transformed Sri Lanka; nearly one third of the plantation area was owned by the local people. With high demand and prices for coffee in the European market, coffee planting increased. The term "Coffee rush" was coined to describe this developing situation in 1840. By 1860, Sri Lanka, Brazil and Indonesia, were the three largest coffee-producing countries in the world.

In 1869, the coffee industry was still thriving in Ceylon, but shortly afterwards, coffee plantations were devastated by the fungal disease Hemileia vastatrix, also known as coffee leaf rust (CLR), affecting not only Sri Lanka but other areas in Asia over the next 20 years. The planters nicknamed the disease "Devastating Emily".

Production
During the period 1961 to 2013, the highest production was 25,575 tons in 1967, and the lowest was 4,109 tons in 1988. In 2019, the country was the thirty-fifth largest producer in the world. Resent years Sri Lanka coffee production increase 84% nearly $355,000 by 2019. Past 10 years growth arabica coffee, which grows particularly well in the wetland and hill country. Most coffee production near 80% originated from small holding sector.

Revival 
Coffee production in Sri Lanka is seeing signs of revival. Use of high quality local beans for serving coffee has increased since 2014, with more cafes and restaurants in Colombo and other cities sourcing coffee beans from local farmers rather than importing.

References

Bibliography

Sri Lanka
Agriculture in Sri Lanka